"Fall Out" is a song by English new wave rock band the Police.  It was released as their first single in May 1977 with "Nothing Achieving" on its B-side. It was re-released in 1979.  A non-album track, it has appeared on a number of compilation and live albums including Message in a Box: The Complete Recordings, The Police and Live!

Background
"Fall Out" was written by drummer Stewart Copeland, and was one of the first songs he presented to lead singer and bassist Sting when the Police were forming.

The single was recorded before the Police had done any live performances, using a budget of £150 borrowed from Paul Mulligan, and is the only Police recording featuring original guitarist Henry Padovani. Due to nervousness in the studio, Padovani only played the guitar solos for both tracks, with Copeland playing the other guitar parts. Copeland used a Gibson SG for his parts, while Padovani used a Jacobacci.

The b-side, "Nothing Achieving" was written by Stewart Copeland and his brother Ian, with Ian being responsible for most of the lyrics. Both tracks were produced by Stewart Copeland and "Bazza", which was the nickname of engineer Barry Farmer.

The cover art for the single is a photo of the group taken on the roof of Copeland's apartment by his friend Lawrence Impey. Padovani's unusual grimace on the cover, though appropriate for the punk look of the time, was actually a result of his having a major toothache on the day of the shoot. The actual packaging of the 7" singles was done by Copeland and Sting.

Release
"Fall Out" was released on the Illegal Records label, part of the Faulty Products group of companies owned by Copeland's brother Miles. Sting has cited Mick Jagger's review of the single in Sounds magazine as contributor to its success, saying, "we had a coup when Mick Jagger reviewed it in a music weekly called Sounds."  Jagger called the song "“competently played rock, with nasal annihilated vocals.”Ultimate Classic Rock critic Mike Duquette describes the theme as "a man going insane in a post-apocalyptic world."  Copeland estimates that the single sold mostly because it was a part of the overall punk movement; the band appears in the cover photograph in clothes that were fashionable at the time and fans of the punk movement were buying any punk single that came out.

It failed to chart on its original release, but when re-released in 1979 it made number 47 on the UK Singles Chart, two months after "Message in a Bottle" reached number one. On the Record Business national chart then widely used in Independent Local Radio, which polled more independent shops, the 1979 release made number 26, and number 34 on the Record Business London chart broadcast on Capital Radio.

Track listing
UK 7" vinyl single
 "Fall Out" (Stewart Copeland) – 2:03
 "Nothing Achieving" (Stewart Copeland, Ian Copeland) – 1:56

Personnel
Sting – bass, vocals
Henry Padovani – guitar solo
Stewart Copeland – drums, guitar, producer

Charts

References

 

1977 debut singles
1977 singles
1979 singles
The Police songs
1977 songs
Songs written by Stewart Copeland